Field marshall may refer to:

 Misspelling of field marshal, a military rank
 Field Marshall, a tractor

See also
 Marshall Field (disambiguation)